Karl-Rudi Griesbach (14 June 1916 – 8 May 2000) was a German composer, librettist, dramaturge, music critic and academic teacher.

Life 
Born in Breckerfeld, Westphalia, Griesbach attended a Gymnasium in Hamburg and subsequently studied composition with Philipp Jarnach and conducting with Eugen Körner at the Hochschule für Musik und Tanz Köln from 1937. After completing his studies in 1941 he served in the military in World War II and was taken prisoner of war by the Soviets in 1944, from which he was not released until 1949. The following year Griesbach settled in Dresden, where he lived until his death at age 83. In the years 1952 and 1953 he worked at a Berlin theater for a short time. He also wrote reviews and worked as a dramaturge at the Staatsoper Dresden. From 1952 to 1955, Griesbach taught at the Hochschule für Musik Carl Maria von Weber. From 1966 he worked there, first as a lecturer, from 1968 as professor of composition, until he retired from teaching in 1981. Griesbach's wife Margrit appeared as a pianist and interpreted mainly works of her husband.

Music 
Griesbach always tried to write music that was relatively easy to understand. For this reason he took up suggestions from Béla Bartók and also from Arnold Schönberg, but in the end he did not completely break with tonality and was, on the whole, a rather conservative composer for his generation. His music is characterized by a concise rhythm, rather rough timbres and concise forms. In his works, Griesbach sometimes referred to political themes. At the beginning of the 1960s he was interested in foreign musical cultures and was also inspired by blues and African music. His Afrikanische Sinfonie (African Symphony), composed at that time, was a considerable success. His main focus is on stage works. In the GDR and especially in Dresden Griesbach was a respected composer, but after the reunification he was largely forgotten.

Compositions 
Griesbach's music was published by Verlag Neue Musik.
 Orchestral work
 Kleine Sinfonie (1950)
 Afrikanische Sinfonie (1963)
 Sinfonie (67) in memory of the Great Socialist October Revolution (1967)
 Ostinati for orchestra (1976)
 Kontakte for orchestra (1978)
 Szene for orchestra
 Konzertante Musik für Klavier und Kammerorchester (1964)
 Stage works
 Kolumbus, opera (1958)
 Der Schwarze – der Weiße − und die Frau, opera (1963)
 Belle und Armand, opera (1988)
 Aulus und sein Papagei, opera (1982)
 Kleider machen Leute, ballet (1954)
 Schneewittchen, ballet (1956)
 Reinecke Fuchs, ballet (1977)
 Samson, ballet (c. 1980)
 Vocal music
 Planetarisches Manifest, cantata after Johannes R. Becher for soprano, baritone, piano, choir and orchestra (1962)
 Trinke Mut des reinen Lebens, for baritone, female choir and orchestra based on texts by Goethe (1981)
 Song cycle, texts by Shakespeare, Brecht, and others
 Folk song arrangements
 Piano and chamber music
 String Quartet (1977)
 Musik für Flöte und Streichtrio (1953)
 Kleine Olympiade: Klavierstücke für die Jugend (1961)
 blues-impressions, five piano pieces in jazz style (1962)
 Partita for piano (1986)

Further reading 
 Friedbert Streller: Weniger Experiment – mehr Akzeptanz. Zur Dresdner Komponistenschule der Nachkriegszeit und zum kompositorischen Wirken Karl-Rudi Greisbachs in Dresden, in Dresden und die avancierte Musik im 20. Jahrhundert. Part II: 1933-1966, edited by Matthias Herrmann and Hanns-Werner Heister, Laaber 2002,  (Musik in Dresden 5),

References

External links 
 
Nachlass Karl-Rudi Grießbach in the Sächsischen Landesbibliothek – Staats- und Universitätsbibliothek Dresden

1916 births
2000 deaths
20th-century classical composers
20th-century German composers
Ballet composers
German opera composers
Male opera composers
Musicians from North Rhine-Westphalia
People from Ennepe-Ruhr-Kreis
Recipients of the Patriotic Order of Merit in bronze
20th-century German male musicians